Marco Russo (born 25 April 1982) is an Italian footballer who plays for Aurora Seriate.

Biography
Born in Cariati, Calabria, southern Italy, Russo started his career at Calabrian side Reggina. He then left for northern Italy side Padova, then left for the United Kingdom for Birmingham and in November 2000 for Dundee. He was signed by assistant manager, countryman Ivano Bonetti along with defender Umberto Fatello. In June 2001 he was released by the Scottish side and returned to Italy for Serie C2 side Poggese.

After the team relegated, he spent one season at non-professional league, Serie D, for Cassino and Villacidrese.

In summer 2003, he left for Serie C1 side Sassari Torres and in summer 2005 left for Vittoria of Serie C2. But his contract with the Sicily side was terminated in February 2006. and joined Serie C1 side Lumezzane. He followed the team relegated to Serie C2 and remained for 2 seasons, and won promotion back to Serie C1 (which renamed to Lega Pro Prima Divisione) in summer 2008.

He then moved back to Lega Pro Seconda Divisione for Pizzighettone. and in 2009–10 season left for Canavese after Pizzighettone relegated.

In November 2011 he joined Serie D club Aurora Seriate.

References

External links
Profile at Lumezzane 

Profile at FIGC 
Profile at AIC.Football.it 

Italian footballers
Italian expatriate footballers
Scottish Premier League players
Reggina 1914 players
Calcio Padova players
Birmingham City F.C. players
Dundee F.C. players
A.S.D. Cassino Calcio 1924 players
S.S. Villacidrese Calcio players
F.C. Lumezzane V.G.Z. A.S.D. players
A.S. Pizzighettone players
F.C. Canavese players
Association football midfielders
Expatriate footballers in England
Expatriate footballers in Scotland
Italian expatriate sportspeople in England
Sportspeople from the Province of Cosenza
1982 births
Living people
F.C. Vittoria players
Italian expatriate sportspeople in Scotland
Footballers from Calabria